Depew Lodge No. 823, Free and Accepted Masons is a historic building located at Lancaster in Erie County, New York.  It is a locally distinctive example of the Neo-Classical Revival style of architecture. Built between 1916 and 1919 as a meeting hall for the local Masons (DePew Lodge No. 823, which no longer exists). Today, it is used as a commercial office building.

It was listed on the National Register of Historic Places in 1999.  It is included in the Broadway Historic District.

References

External links
DePew Lodge No. 823, Free and Accepted Masons - U.S. National Register of Historic Places on Waymarking.com

Clubhouses on the National Register of Historic Places in New York (state)
Former Masonic buildings in New York (state)
Neoclassical architecture in New York (state)
Masonic buildings completed in 1919
Buildings and structures in Erie County, New York
National Register of Historic Places in Erie County, New York
Historic district contributing properties in Erie County, New York